Acanthocinus henschi is a species of longhorn beetles of the subfamily Lamiinae. It was described by Reitter in 1900, and is known from Austria, Croatia, Italy, and Macedonia. The beetles measure 7-11 millimetres in length, and live for approximately 1–2 years. They inhabit trees in the species Pinus nigra.

References

Beetles described in 1900
Acanthocinus